Poison is a 1987 album by the Japanese rock band Rebecca which reached No.1 in the Japanese album charts and received a RIAJ Gold Disc Award for best rock album of the year, as well as winning Grand Prix for artist in all genres in the same year.

References

1987 albums
Rebecca (band) albums